Vincent Descoeur (born 13 December 1962, in Aurillac) is a member of the National Assembly of France.  He represents the Cantal's 1st constituency, from 2007 to 2012 as a member of the Union for a Popular Movement and from 2017 as a member of the Republicans.
He was a Cantal general councilor from 1987, and president of the Council from 2001 to 2017.

Ahead of the 2022 presidential elections, Descoeur publicly declared his support for Michel Barnier as the Republicans’ candidate.

References 

1962 births
Living people
People from Aurillac
Union for a Popular Movement politicians
The Republicans (France) politicians
Deputies of the 13th National Assembly of the French Fifth Republic
Deputies of the 15th National Assembly of the French Fifth Republic
Departmental councillors (France)
People from Cantal
Deputies of the 16th National Assembly of the French Fifth Republic